Olea woodiana, known commonly as the forest olive or black ironwood (Afrikaans: Bosolienhout), is an African tree species belonging to the olive family (Oleaceae).

The tree grows in lower altitude hill forests from Kenya, Tanzania, Eswatini, and South Africa.

Description
Olea woodiana is a medium-sized to tall tree.  The axillary or terminal inflorescences carry small white flowers that are fragrant.

Fruit are produced from late summer. They are oval-shaped and ripen to a purple black colour, when they are consumed by birds.

Subspecies
There are two recognized subspecies:

Olea woodiana subsp. disjuncta – Kenya, Tanzania
Olea woodiana subsp. woodiana – Eswatini, South Africa

References

External links

woodiana
Trees of Africa
Flora of East Tropical Africa
Flora of Southern Africa
Bird food plants
Plants described in 1893